Edgardo "Egay" Tallado (born July 9, 1963) is a Filipino politician from the province of Camarines Norte in the Philippines. He previously serves as a Governor of Camarines Norte from 2010 to 2022. He was first elected as governor of the province in 2010 and was re-elected in 2013 as his second term, third term in 2016 and last term in 2019.

Career
On June 15, 2015, Liberal Party removed Tallado after he was found “guilty of committing grossly immoral conduct.”

In October 2015, Tallado was dismissed by the Ombudsman of the Philippines.

References

External links
Province of Camarines Norte (Official Website)

Living people
Governors of Camarines Norte
PDP–Laban politicians
1963 births